The Twelfth Federal Electoral District of Chiapas (XII Distrito Electoral Federal de Chiapas) is one of the 300 Electoral Districts into which Mexico is divided for the purpose of elections to the federal Chamber of Deputies and one of 12 such districts in the state of Chiapas.

It elects one deputy to the lower house of Congress for each three-year legislative period, by means of the first past the post system.

District territory
The Twelfth District of Chiapas is located in the extreme south of the state and comprises the municipalities of Frontera Hidalgo, Metapa, Suchiate, Tuxtla Chico and three-quarters of the municipality of  Tapachula
(the northern quarter of that municipality is in the Eleventh District).

The district's head town (cabecera distrital), where results from individual polling stations are gathered together and collated, is the city of Tapachula.

Previous districting schemes

1996–2005 district
Between 1996 and 2005, the Twelfth  District had a different configuration: it covered Tapachula municipality in its entirety, together with Cacahoatán and Unión Juárez, in addition to those other that it still covers at present.

The Twelfth District of Chiapas was created in 1996. Between 1979 and 1996, Chiapas only had nine federal electoral districts. The Tenth to Twelfth Districts elected their first deputies, to the 57th Congress, in 1997.

Deputies returned to Congress from this district

LVII Legislature
 1997–2000:  Ranulfo Tonche Pacheco (PRI)
LVIII Legislature
 2000–2003:  Adolfo Zamora Cruz (PRI)
LIX Legislature
 2003–2006:  Carlos Pano Becerra (PRI)
LX Legislature
 2006–2009:  Antonio de Jesús Díaz Athié (PRI)

References and notes 

Federal electoral districts of Mexico
Government of Chiapas